Mortal Kombat: Live Tour was a martial art theatrical stage show featuring Mortal Kombat characters, sound, and laser light effects on stage. The plot was based on three fighters rescuing their friends and retrieving a magic amulet from the evil master of Outworld, Shao Kahn, in order to save the Earth.

The show debuted at Radio City Music Hall in New York City on September 14, 1995, followed by a 200 city road trip into 1996. It replicated Mortal Kombat martial arts and video game moves on stage mixed with dancing and music. Lip synching were pre-recorded and used to demonstrate the official MK sound effects, though there was no graphic violence or Fatalities visible in the show. The audience participated by yelling "Run!" or "Kick him!" as part of the live action.

Plot
Theatrical Mortal Kombat stage show that featured martial arts, sounds from the game and laser light effects. Three Earth warriors travel to Outworld to rescue their comrade and find an amulet that can defeat Shao Kahn and save Earth.

Cast

Baraka #1 — Ryan Watson
Baraka #2 — Allen Sandoval
Jax #1 — Hakim Alston
Jax #2 — Shah Alston
Jax #3 — Tyrone C. Wiggins
Johnny Cage #1 — Jeffrey D. Harris
Johnny Cage #2 — Brad Halstead
Johnny Cage #3 — Ted Nordblum
Johnny Cage #4 — Jeff Durbin
Johnny Cage #5 — Garry Waugh
Kabal — Tracy Fleming
Kano — Joseph "Eddie" Acavedo
Kano#2 — Mark Chemeleski
Nightwolf #1 — Jeffery D. Harris
Nightwolf #2 — Ted Nordblum
King Baraka — Percy Brown
Kitana #1  — Jennifer DeCosta
Kitana #2  — Lexi Alexander (credited as Lexi Mirai)
Liu Kang #1 — Carmichael Simon
Liu Kang #2 — Jon Valera
Liu Kang #3 — Allen Sandoval
Liu Kang #4 — Michael Li
Mileena  — Jennifer DeCosta
Mileena #2  — Lexi Alexander (credited as Lexi Mirai)
Raiden — Garth Johnson
Scorpion #1 — Anthony Demarco
Scorpion #2 — Darius Wahrhaftig
Scorpion #3 — Drew MacIver
Shang Tsung #1 — Sidney S. Liufau
Shang Tsung #2 — James Kim
Shang Tsung #3 — Simon Kim
Shang Tsung #4 — Michael Li
Shang Tsung #5 — Jimim Kim
Shang Tsung #6 — Drew MacIver
Shao Kahn #1 — Jeffrey D. Harris
Shao Kahn #2 — Ted Nordblum
Sindel #1 — Eileen Weisinger
Sindel #2 — June Castro
Sonya #1 — Kerri Hoskins
Sonya #2 — Cathleen Ann Gardner
Sub Zero #1 — Ryan Watson
Sub Zero #2 — Darius Wahrhaftig
Sub Zero #3 — Drew MacIver

Production
The lasers were produced by Laser Fantasy International of Seattle and operated by Dave Haskell and Chris Thornberry. A medium frame Spectra Physics and a 40 watt laser scope were used along with a custom fiber system for these effects. It was produced in part by "David Fishof Presents".

Hakim Alston (Jax) played an Outworld warrior who was defeated by Liu Kang (Robin Shou) in the original MK movie a year earlier. Fight coordinator Cary-Hiroyuki Tagawa also appeared in the movie as Shang Tsung.

Release

Tour dates
Mortal Kombat: Live Tour had two separate touring companies running simultaneously, which is why some dates are listed twice.

Reception

Critical response
In 2011, 1UP.com featured the show in the article "The Top Ten Times Mortal Kombat Went Wrong" and GamesRadar ranked it as number one on the list of "most absurd Mortal Kombat offshoots".

References

External links
Mortal Kombat: The Live Tour on the IMDb
POP REVIEW; Heroes in Outworld, Fighting to Save the Earth, New York Times, September 16, 1995.

1995 plays
Midway video games
Touring theatre
Works based on Mortal Kombat